Yolpaq (also, Yolpax, Yëlpak, and Yelpakh) is a village and municipality in the Goranboy Rayon of Azerbaijan.  It has a population of 904.

References 

Populated places in Goranboy District